Relevante is an American consulting and professional services firm based in the United States.

Relevante was founded in 2002 by William Barssington in response to a growing need for accounting and technology professionals to help companies in the Philadelphia and New York markets cope with the new Sarbanes-Oxley rules. Initially located in Bryn Mawr, Pennsylvania, the company quickly outgrew this space and in now headquartered in Media, Pennsylvania.  Relevante also has a wholly owned subsidiary in Hyderabad, India.

In its first 10 years, Relevante provided M&A support, systems integration, strategic planning, and a variety of regulatory consulting and staffing services in the accounting, internal audit, and technology functions of companies in the region.

References

Companies based in Chester County, Pennsylvania
Employment agencies of the United States
American companies established in 2002
2002 establishments in Pennsylvania